Gryaztsy is a rural locality (a village) in Samovetskoye Rural Settlement, Ertilsky District, Voronezh Oblast, Russia. The population was 50 in 2010. There are two streets.

Geography 
Gryaztsy is located 39 km west of Ertil (the district's administrative centre) by road. Kolodeyevka is the nearest rural locality.

References 

Rural localities in Ertilsky District